Dina Tersago (born 3 January 1979 in Puurs, Antwerp) is a Belgian TV personality and former beauty queen. She was crowned Miss Belgium 2001 and represented her country at both Miss Universe 2001 and Miss World 2001.

She is now a TV personality, hosting Boer zkt. Vrouw, Superhond 2007 en Superhond 2008 and starring in the fictional soap Brix and Bongers, introduced in Het Geslacht De Pauw, alongside Bart De Pauw, afterwards he was replaced by Tom Van Landuyt. She was the host of health and fitness programme Let's Get Physical which began in 2013.

References

External links

1979 births
Belgian beauty pageant winners
Dancing with the Stars winners
Flemish models
Living people
Miss Universe 2001 contestants
Miss World 2001 delegates
People from Puurs-Sint-Amands